Trebež is a village in central Croatia, in the municipality of Jasenovac, Sisak-Moslavina County.

Demographics
According to the 2011 census, the village of Trebež has 53 inhabitants. This represents 63.10% of its pre-war population.

According to the 1991 census, 79 residents were ethnic Croats (94.05%), 3 were ethic Serbs (3.57%), and 2 were Yugoslavs (2.38%).

Sights 
 Monument and memorial to the victims of the Jasenovac concentration camp

References

Populated places in Sisak-Moslavina County